David Klein may refer to:

 David Klein (American artist) (1918–2005), American artist
 David Klein (businessman), American inventor of the Jelly Belly brand jelly bean
 David Klein (chess player) (born 1993), Dutch chess grandmaster
 David Klein (cinematographer) (born 1972), American cinematographer
 David Klein (Constellation Brands), American businessman
 David Klein (economist) (1935–2021), former governor of the Bank of Israel
 David Klein (footballer) (born 1973), French soccer player
 David Klein (mathematician) (born 1953), American professor of mathematics
 Dave Klein (musician), American drummer
 David Klein (ophthalmologist) (1908–1993), Swiss ophthalmologist
 Dave Klein (punk musician) (born 1979), American bass guitarist